Nagazou, Nagazoo or Nagazu (Arabic: نقزو) is an island in the Nile River, located within the state of Sudan, 16 :28' :18.55" N & 32 :48' : 51.47" E (GPS) on 
Google maps.  It lies about 100km north of Khartoum, and 18 kilometers north of the Sixth Cataract. It is the last island in an archipelago, which formed as the result of the cataract.

The village belongs to the Wad Hamid locality affiliate, and the residents belong to the ja'alin tribe.  Agriculture is the main livelihood of the population, along with transport, trade and services. The most important agricultural products are potatoes, broad beans, onions, tomatoes, vegetables, coriander, fenugreek (in arabicحلبه ), hummus, beans and legumes, and fodder. The island's geographic location is a great advantage, as it provides a link between Hajar al Asal (in Arabic حجر العسل) and Wad Hamid localities.  Local ferries assist in easy transportation between the two river banks.

Due to the availability of water throughout the year and the green landscape, the village is recognized as a tourist area, but it needs to be developed to raise the level of services.

History
The location of this island in the north Sudan made it an historical area where, through the ages, various campaigns of invasion and liberation have passed by.  A ship near the island was part of  Herbert Kitchener Pasha's campaign, which set up a camp near Wad Hamid on 24 August 1898 before Pasha went on to the Battle of Omdurman.

References

Populated places in River Nile (state)
Ja'alin tribe